A chignon is a popular type of hairstyle. The word "chignon" comes from the French phrase chignon du cou, which means nape of the neck.

Chignons are generally achieved by pinning the hair into a knot at the nape of the neck or at the back of the head, but there are many variations of the style. They are usually secured with accessories such as barrettes or hairpins. Chignons are frequently worn for special occasions, like weddings and formal dances, but the basic chignon is also worn for everyday casual wear.

History
The chignon can be traced back to ancient Greece, where Athenian women commonly wore the style with gold or ivory handcrafted hairpins. Athenian men wore the style as well, but they fastened their chignons with a clasp of "golden grasshoppers", according to The History of the Peloponnesian War, by Thucydides. The chignon was specific to Athens, as other city states, such as Cyprus and Sparta, had their own styles of hairdressing. The chignon was also popular in ancient China, where married women wore the low, knotted hairstyle.

Male writers of the Victorian era, like Anthony Trollope, were fond of poking fun at the perceived absurdity of the fashion, which was much in vogue in England in the 1860s. In the 1890s, the dancer Cléo de Mérode popularized the hairstyle in France.

See also
 Bun
 Cockernonnie
 List of hairstyles

References

Bibliography
 
 
 
 "History of Hair". 2004. UKHairdressers. Accessed 29 April 2007.

External links
 

19th-century fashion
Hairstyles